Cristilabrum spectaculum is a species of air-breathing land snail, a terrestrial pulmonate gastropod mollusk in the family Camaenidae. This species is endemic to Australia.

References 

Gastropods of Australia
spectaculum
Gastropods described in 1985
Taxonomy articles created by Polbot